Dul-e Gap may refer to:

Dul-e Gap, Khuzestan
Dul-e Gap, Lorestan